The 2015 Sultan Azlan Shah Cup was the 24th edition of the Sultan Azlan Shah Cup. It was held from 5 April to 12 April 2015 in Ipoh, Perak, Malaysia.

New Zealand won the tournament for the second time after defeating Australia 1–3 on penalties, after the match ended in a draw at 2–2, in the final.

Participating nations
Six countries participated in this year's tournament:

Results
All times are Malaysia Standard Time (UTC+08:00)

Pool

Classification

Fifth and sixth

Third and fourth place

Final

Awards
Fairplay: 
Best Player:  Mark Knowles
Man of the Match of Final:  Andy Hayward
Best Goalkeeper:  Devon Manchester
Top Scorer:  Jamie Dwyer (8 goals)

Final standings

References

External links
 Fixtures and Results

2015
2015 in field hockey
2015 in Malaysian sport
2015 in Australian field hockey
2015 in Canadian sports
2015 in New Zealand sport
2015 in South Korean sport
2015 in Indian sport
April 2015 sports events in Asia